The 1929 Georgia Southern Eagles football team represented the South Georgia Teachers College—now known as Georgia Southern University—as an independent during the 1929 college football season. Led by first-year head coach Crook Smith, the team compiled a record of 4–3–2.

Schedule

References

South Georgia Teachers
Georgia Southern Eagles football seasons
South Georgia Teachers Blue Tide football